Alan Tilvern (5 November 1918 – 17 December 2003) was an English actor. He was known for usually playing "tough-guy" roles.

Life
Tilvern was born 5 November 1918 in Whitechapel, in the East End of London, to Jewish-Lithuanian parents, who changed their name from Tilevitch.

War and film career
After leaving school, he became a barrow boy in Brick Lane. In the Second World War, he served in the Army but was invalided out before its end in 1945. A year later, he began an acting career (Danger by My Side being a good example), that lasted until the late 1980s. He is possibly best known for his role as R. K. Maroon in his last film, Who Framed Roger Rabbit.

Death
Tilvern died on 17 December 2003, at the age of 85.  He was survived by his daughter.

Filmography

Television appearances

Film

References

External links
 
 Alan Tilvern at Theatricalia

1918 births
2003 deaths
English male television actors
English people of Lithuanian-Jewish descent
English male film actors
English male voice actors
Jewish English male actors
English Ashkenazi Jews
People from Whitechapel
Male actors from London
British Army personnel of World War II
20th-century English male actors